Carrión de Calatrava is a municipality in the province of Ciudad Real, Castile-La Mancha, Spain.  The castle of Calatrava la Vieja is situated nearby.

References

Municipalities in the Province of Ciudad Real